The following is a list of notable schools in Tanzania.

Schools 

 Al Muntazir School Network, Dar es Salaam
 Bethany Pre and Primary English Medium School, Kisongo, Arusha Region.
 Goba Secondary School, Dar es Salaam
 Haven of Peace Academy, Dar es Salaam
 International School of Tanganyika, Dar es Salaam
 International School of Zanzibar
 Isamilo International School Mwanza, Mwanza
 Jitegemee, Dar es Salaam
 Kennedy House International School, Usa River, Meru District,  Arusha Region. 
 Kibaha Secondary School, Kibaha, Pwani Region
Kings Secondary School, Dar es Salaam

 Kishumundu Secondary School, Kilimanjaro Region. 
 Lady of mercy School, Arusha
 Lumumba Secondary School, Zanzibar
 Malangali Secondary School, Iringa
 Montfort Agricultural Secondary School, Rujewa
 Morogoro International School, Morogoro
 Musoma Alliance Secondary School, Musoma
 Mwananyamala, Dar es Salaam
 Mwanza International School, Mwanza
 Ngarenaro Secoundary School, Arusha
 Popatlal Secondary School, Tanga
 Pugu High School, Ilala
 Pugu Secondary School, Dar es Salaam
 Saint Mary Goreti Secondary School, Moshi
 School of St Jude, Arusha, Tanzania
 Shaaban Robert Secondary School, Dar es Salaam
 Siha Secoundary School, Siha District, Kilimanjaro Region 
 St. Francis Girls' Secondary School, Mbeya
 St. Mary's International Schools, Dar es Salaam, Dodoma, Mbeya, Morogoro
 United World College East Africa
 Utemini, Singida
 Weruweru High School, Hai
 Weruweru Secondary School, Kilimanjaro

See also
 
 Education in Tanzania
 Lists of schools

References

External links
Complete Tanzania School List

Schools
Schools
Tanzania
Tanzania

Schools